Dušan Popeskov (born 5 June 1969) is a Serbian former cyclist. He competed in two events at the 1992 Summer Olympics as an Independent Olympic Participant.

References

External links
 

1969 births
Living people
Serbian male cyclists
Yugoslav male cyclists
Olympic cyclists as Independent Olympic Participants
Cyclists at the 1992 Summer Olympics
Place of birth missing (living people)